Helen Hall is a rock memorabilia and film memorabilia expert, an appraiser and auctioneer. A former Vice-President at Christie's, Hall now works with private collectors, musicians, film actors, directors, auction houses and museums all over the world to research, appraise, authenticate and value objects, manuscripts, clothing and instruments. 

Hall was Head of Entertainment Memorabilia at Christie's, New York. During her time at Christie's, Hall was involved in bringing to auction some collections and celebrity estates, including the personal property Of Marlon Brando (2004); 40 Years Of Star Trek (2006); The Estate Of Clark Gable (2006); The Estate Of Stan Laurel (2007); The John Lennon Collection of “Magic” Alex Mardas (2004); The Star Wars Collection Of John Mollo (2003); Eric Clapton's Guitars in aid of the Crossroads Centre (1999 and 2004).

As a Christie's auctioneer, Hall has been involved with artifacts such as Marlon Brando's script for The Godfather, John Lennon's hand-written lyrics for "Give Peace A Chance" and the drum from the cover of the Beatles LP Sgt. Pepper's Lonely Hearts Club Band.

In 2008, Hall launched DIG to work with musicians, actors, film directors, models, politicians and other personalities to research, preserve and archive their career-related assets. DIG provides Appraisals, Archival and Collection Management services. Privately, Helen has also brokered important sales of rock memorabilia, including Kurt Cobain's Fender Mustang guitar and Sid Vicious' Swastika T-shirt. Hall has also consulted for Christie's and Phillips auction houses and works closely with museums and institutions such as the Victoria and Albert Museum, London; the Rock and Roll Hall Of Fame, Cleveland and the Experience Music Project, Seattle.

Notes

Year of birth missing (living people)
Living people
British auctioneers
Female auctioneers